Ken Vedsegaard (born 14 October 1972) is a Danish actor.

Biography
Son of a restaurateur and raised in Copenhagen, Vedsegaard trained at the Skuespillerskolen at Aarhus Teater between 1996 and 2000. He is currently known for his role as Jesper Bang in the comedy/crime series Black Widows.

Vedsegaard has starred in a long list of television, theatre and film titles.

Film 
 Skyggen af Emma (1988) Albert
 Guldregn (1988) Lasse Brandt
 The Boys from St.Petri (1991) Student
 Høfeber (1991) Knallertkører
 En dag i oktober (1991) Resistance man
 Stolen Spring (1993) Young Aksel Nielsen
 Sidste time (1995) Rasmus
 Fede tider (1996) Henrik
 Slim Slam Slum (2002) Verner
 Den rette ånd (2005) Poul
 A Viking Saga (2007) Oleg
 ..Og det var Danmark (2008) Speaker

Television series
 Strisser på Samsø episodes 1 - 3(1997) Fisker/Mand på kroen
 Taxa episode 36 (1999) Friend
 Rejseholdet episode 24 (2002) Carsten
 Hotellet episodes 45 - 48 (2002) Rolf
 Krøniken episodes 1 - 15, 22 (2004–2007) Erik Nielsen
 Maj & Charlie (2008) Bo
 Forbrydelsen 2 episodes 1 - 10 (2009) Jens Peter Raben

References

External links

1972 births
Danish male film actors
Danish male television actors
Living people
Male actors from Copenhagen
20th-century Danish male actors
21st-century Danish male actors